The Council of Judges and Prosecutors, HSK; previously named as Supreme Board of Judges and Prosecutors is the disciplinary body of the legal system of the Republic of Turkey and the national council of the judiciary of Turkey. It was established under the 1982 Constitution of Turkey and significantly amended by the Turkish constitutional referendum, 2010 (including an expansion from 7 members to 22). After  2017 constitutional referendum, members are reduced to 13.

The Council currently consists of the thirteen members: seven appointed by the Parliament from high courts and lawyers, and four by the President from civil and administrative judges and prosecutors, the Minister of Justice, and the Ministry Undersecretary. The three branches —the legislative, executive, and judicial— of state as well as practicing lawyers are represented in the Council. Thus, the shaping of the judicial body, through the appointments, is carried out by all the authorities together.

Aidul Fitriciada Azhari, the chairman of the Judicial Commission of Indonesia, praised the Supreme Board's efforts during the 2016 Turkish purges as a positive example of external oversight of a judicial system.

Election of members

List of members

See also
 2013 corruption scandal in Turkey
 Association of Judicial Unity

References

External links
 www.hsk.gov.tr (Turkish) / www.cjp.gov.tr (English)

Judiciary of Turkey
Law of Turkey
National councils of the judiciary